Mellow Mood is an album by jazz pianist Oscar Peterson and his trio, released in 1968 (see 1968 in music). The session was recorded in Germany at the private studio of Hans Georg Brunner-Schwer and released on the German MPS label. This album was the fifth part of Peterson's Exclusively for My Friends series on MPS. The series was reissued as a box set in 1992 by MPS (and later expanded with The Lost Tapes). A remastered SACD was issued in 2003 on Verve Records.

Reception

Writing for AllMusic, critic Ken Dryden wrote "The fifth volume of Oscar Peterson's Exclusively for My Friends series is another lively trio affair with Sam Jones and Bobby Durham, though the album title Mellow Mood is a bit deceptive."

The Penguin Guide to Jazz includes the album in its selected "Core Collection".

Track listing 
 "In a Mellow Tone" (Duke Ellington, Milt Gabler) – 6:07
 "Nica's Dream" (Horace Silver) – 7:56
 "On Green Dolphin Street" (Bronislau Kaper, Ned Washington) – 6:27
 "Summertime" (George Gershwin, Ira Gershwin, DuBose Heyward) – 5:30
 "Sometimes I'm Happy" (Irving Caesar, Vincent Youmans) – 5:12
 "Who Can I Turn To (When Nobody Needs Me)" (Leslie Bricusse, Anthony Newley) – 6:26

Personnel 
 Oscar Peterson – piano
 Sam Jones – double bass
 Bobby Durham – drums

References 

1968 albums
Oscar Peterson albums
MPS Records albums